The Puerto Rico Industrial Development Company (PRIDCO) — (or simply Fomento)— is a government-owned corporation of Puerto Rico authorized and empowered to induce private capital into Puerto Rico in order to establish trade, cooperatives, and industrial operations in Puerto Rico. As its primary function, PRIDCO is known for providing incentives to both native and foreign companies that either manufacture in Puerto Rico or export from Puerto Rico.

History
PRIDCO was created by the government of Puerto Rico in 1942 along with the Puerto Rico Government Development Bank (GDB) during the governorship of Rexford G. Tugwell. Its purpose was to finance the construction and operational management of industrial parks where stateside manufacturing companies could find low-rent venues for their operations.

For decades, PRIDCO operated as a subsidiary of the Puerto Rico Economic Development Administration (PREDA); the agency that oversaw the systematic operation which transformed the economy of Puerto Rico from an agricultural economy into an industrial one known as Operation Bootstrap. Bootstrap was the brainchild of PREDA's first administrator, Teodoro Moscoso. Other notable industrialists served in PREDA as well, such as Hugo David Storer Tavarez who served as the director of promotion for some years, and William Riefkohl who served as its deputy administrator from 1988 to 1992.

As PREDA continued to transform Puerto Rico, PRIDCO eventually became an independent agency. A government reorganization eventually merged PREDA into PRIDCO, establishing PRIDCO as the focal agency for all manufacturing in Puerto Rico while PREDA ceased to exist.

Today, PRIDCO also oversees the program to promote Puerto Rican rums which enjoy cover-over subsidies when sold in the United States. The agency is also now under the umbrella of the Department of Economic Development and Commerce of Puerto Rico (DDEC), an executive department.

In 2019, the agency was tasked with creating a database of business owners who are veterans of the United States military with a mandate to adhere to a law that requires supporting and helping veteran business owners.

Along with the Puerto Rico Department of Agriculture, in 2019, the organization discussed plans to import coffee beans from different locations in order to mix and cultivate new coffee plants in Puerto Rico.

In August, 2019 employees of PRIDCO protested against the direction of PROMESA, the non-elected board working on restructuring Puerto Rico's debt. PRIDCO employees demanded more transparency and more consideration for the work PRIDCO has been doing for decades.

In early 2020, the police were investigating the illegal transfer of funds by PRIDCO to overseas accounts.

Executive directors

As PREDA
Teodoro Moscoso
José Madera
Manuel Dubón
Xavier Romeu

As PRIDCO
Enrique Rodríguez Negrón
Xavier Romeu
Jaime Morgan Stubbe
William Riefkohl
Jorge Silva Puras
Boris Jaskille
Javier Vazquez Morales
 2011–2013: José Pérez Riera
 2013–present: Antonio Medina Comas
Rafael L Ignacio Torres 1961-1965 vice-president PRIDCO
Rafael L Ignacio Torres 1984-1990 President of PRIDCO

References

1942 establishments in Puerto Rico
Financial services companies established in 1942
Government-owned corporations of Puerto Rico
Industrial development agencies
Manufacturing in Puerto Rico